Devletşah Hatun, was the daughter of Süleyman Şah Bey, the ruler of the Germiyanids. She was a consort of Sultan Bayezid I of the Ottoman Empire.

Family
Devletşah Hatun was born to an Anatolian prince, Süleyman Şah Bey, the ruler of the Germiyanids. Her mother Mutahhara Hatun, affectionately called 'Abide' (the adoring one), was a granddaughter of Mawlānā Jalal al-Din Muhammad Rumi, the founder of the Sufi order of Mevlevis, through his son Sultan Walad. She had two brothers, Ilyas Pasha, and Hızır Pasha.

Marriage
In 1378, Süleyman Şah, sent an envoy to sultan Murad I, proposing a marriage between his daughter, Devletşah Hatun and crown prince Bayezid. He wished to protect his territory against the invasions of the Karamanids, had proposed this marriage and had offered, as a dowry to his daughter, Kütahya, his seat of power and several other Germiyan cities. Murad agreed and acquired most of the principality.

The chroniclers testify of the riches that was displayed during the wedding feast. Envoys from the Karamanids, Hamidoğu, Mentesheoğlu, Saruhanids, Isfendiyarids and an envoy of the Mamluk sultan were all present at the wedding feast. The chroniclers describe the valuable presents brought by Gazi Evrenos, the Ottoman marcher lord (akıncı uç beyi) in Europe, to the wedding, which included among other items cloths of gold, two hundred gold and silver trays filled with gold florins.

During the wedding feast, the envoy of Hüseyin Bey, the ruler
of the Hamidili principality, offered to sell his beylik to Murad. When, afterwards, Murad came to Kütahya, Hüseyin Bey sent his envoy to conclude the formalities of the sale.

Ancestry

See also
List of consorts of the Ottoman Sultans

References

Sources

14th-century consorts of Ottoman sultans
Year of birth uncertain
Place of birth unknown
Date of death unknown
Place of death unknown
Princesses